USS Osmus (DE-701) was a  of the United States Navy, named for Wesley Frank Osmus, a Navy aviator posthumously awarded the Navy Cross after his TBD Devastator from  was shot down during the Battle of Midway on 4 June 1942. Research many years later indicated Ensign Osmus survived his plane's ditching but was captured, tortured and executed by the Japanese later that same day.

The ship was laid down at the Defoe Shipbuilding Company, Bay City, Michigan, on 17 August 1943, and launched on 4 November 1943, sponsored by Mrs. Louisa Osmus, mother of Ensign Osmus; and commissioned on 23 February 1944.

Service history

World War II, 1944–1945
Following shakedown off Bermuda, Osmus departed the east coast, transited the Panama Canal, and sailed into the Pacific.  She arrived at Espiritu Santo on 1 June; and after availability and further training, undertook her first escort mission, to Guadalcanal, on 13 June.  On 18 June, she rendezvoused with TU 11.1A, joining CortDiv 39 at the same time.  The ships then sailed northwest to the Admiralties.  A week later, Osmus was back in the Solomons-New Hebrides area, where she operated as an escort vessel until 10 November.

From the Solomons, Osmus shifted her base of operations to Ulithi and through January 1945, performing escort assignments between the Western Carolines, Admiralties, and Palaus.  In early February, she reported to Commander, Guam Patrol and Escort Unit, and for the remainder of the war, escorted vessels amongst the Marianas and to Okinawa, and conducted air-sea rescue missions and anti-submarine warfare patrols in the Marianas.  At the end of August, the destroyer escort steamed to Rota for preliminary surrender conferences, and then when to Truk for the official surrender there, on 2 September. Osmus remained as communications vessel at Truk for a week, then sailed back to Guam.  On 18 September, she stood out of Apra Harbor for San Pedro, Los Angeles.

Post-war activities, 1946–1947
She remained on the west coast until 22 June 1946, when she set a course for the Far East.  A month later, she arrived at Tsingtao for a month's China service.  At the end of August, she shifted operations to Okinawa, and in October steamed to Korea for customs patrol duty off the American Occupation Zone.  Another tour in China followed, and in February 1947, Osmus got underway for the United States.  On 2 March, she arrived at San Diego, and on 15 March, she decommissioned and joined the Pacific Reserve Fleet. Into 1970, she remained a unit of that fleet, berthed at Mare Island.

Awards
Osmus received one battle star for her World War II service.

References

External links
 

Buckley-class destroyer escorts
Ships built in Bay City, Michigan
World War II frigates and destroyer escorts of the United States
1943 ships